Vagarshak Arutyunovich Ter-Vaganyan (1893–1936) was an Armenian Soviet Communist Party official, journalist and functionary who was one of the first victims of Joseph Stalin's Great Purge.

Ter-Vaganyan was one of sixteen Soviet intellectuals who stood as defendants during the Moscow Show Trials. He was accused of being part of the Trotskyite-Zinovievite centre which allegedly prepared terrorist acts against Stalin, Klim Voroshilov, Andrei Zhdanov, Lazar Kaganovich, Sergo Ordzhonikidze, Stanislav Kosior, and Pavel Postyshev.  Under pressure, Ter-Vaganyan admitted his "guilt." He was shot and his personal property was confiscated by the Soviet Union.

See also
 Armenian SSR
 Aghasi Khanjian
 Moscow Trials

References

External links 
 Vaganian Home Page

1893 births
1936 deaths
People from Syunik Province
People from Elizavetpol Governorate
Soviet politicians
Great Purge victims from Armenia
Trial of the Sixteen (Great Purge)
Communist Party of Armenia (Soviet Union) politicians
Armenian atheists
Members of the Communist Party of the Soviet Union executed by the Soviet Union